Ronny Martens (born 22 December 1958 in Geraardsbergen) is a retired Belgian footballer.

During his career he played for R.S.C. Anderlecht, K.S.K. Beveren, K.A.A. Gent, K.V. Mechelen, and R.W.D. Molenbeek. He participated in UEFA Euro 1980, but did not earn any senior international caps in his career.

Honours

Player 

 RSC Anderlecht

 European Cup Winners' Cup: 1977–78 (winners)
 European Super Cup: 1978
 Belgian First Division: 1980–81
 Jules Pappaert Cup: 1977
 Belgian Sports Merit Award: 1978

SK Beveren 

 Belgian First Division: 1983–84
 Belgian Cup: 1982-83

KV Mechelen

 Belgian Cup: 1986–87

International 
Belgium

 UEFA European Championship: 1980 (runners-up)
 Belgian Sports Merit Award: 1980

References 

 Royal Belgian Football Association: Number of caps

1958 births
Living people
People from Geraardsbergen
Belgian footballers
UEFA Euro 1980 players
R.S.C. Anderlecht players
K.S.K. Beveren players
K.A.A. Gent players
K.V. Mechelen players
R.W.D. Molenbeek players
Belgian Pro League players
Association football forwards
Footballers from East Flanders